Steven David Johnson (born August 31, 1987) is an American former professional baseball pitcher. He made his Major League Baseball (MLB) debut with the Baltimore Orioles in 2012 and also played in MLB for the Seattle Mariners.

Early life
Steve Johnson was born to Dave and Tera Johnson. His father, Dave Johnson, pitched in MLB for five seasons, including three for Baltimore, and is now a broadcaster on MASN, which airs Orioles and Nationals games. Johnson graduated from St. Paul's School in 2005 where he played baseball.

Professional career

Los Angeles Dodgers
Johnson was drafted by the Los Angeles Dodgers in the 13th round of the 2005 MLB Draft out of St. Paul's School for Boys in Brooklandville, Maryland. He pitched for the GCL Dodgers in 2005, going 0–2 with a 9.53 ERA in six games (three starts). He split 2006 between the Ogden Raptors (14 starts) and Jacksonville Suns (two relief appearances), going a combined 5–5 with a 3.67 ERA. In 2007, he went 3–6 with a 4.85 ERA in 18 games (16 starts) for the Great Lakes Loons.

Johnson split 2008 between the Loons (13 starts) and Inland Empire 66ers (11 starts), going a combined 12–8 with a 4.32 ERA. He started the 2009 season in the Dodgers' organization, pitching for the 66ers (18 games, 16 starts) and Chattanooga Lookouts (two starts).

Baltimore Orioles
On July 30, he was traded with minor leaguer Josh Bell to the Baltimore Orioles for George Sherrill. He finished the season with the Bowie Baysox. Overall, he went a combined 12–7 with a 3.41 ERA in 27 games (25 starts).

The San Francisco Giants selected him in the 2009 Rule 5 Draft, but he was returned to the Orioles on March 16, 2010.

Johnson had his contract purchased by the Orioles on June 3, 2012, but was immediately optioned to the Triple-A Norfolk Tides. He was called up to the major leagues for the first time on July 1, 2012, in Seattle, but did not play in the two games before he was optioned down again. He finally made his major league debut on July 15, 2012 against the Detroit Tigers in Baltimore. On August 8, 2012, he started and won his first game against the Seattle Mariners, 23 years to the day after his father pitched his first victory for the Orioles.

On April 24, 2013, Johnson was sent to the Norfolk Tides on a rehab assignment. He was brought up to the Orioles on May 11 to start against the Minnesota Twins, and optioned back to Norfolk the next day.  He was recalled on May 25 when Pedro Strop was placed on the disabled list.

Johnson was outrighted off the Orioles roster on October 24, 2014. He was added back to the Orioles roster on September 1, 2015.

Texas Rangers
On January 29, 2016, Johnson signed a minor league contract with the Texas Rangers, with an invitation to Spring Training. He was released on March 14.

Seattle Mariners
Johnson signed with the Seattle Mariners prior to the 2016 season.

Second Stint with Orioles
On March 4, 2017, Johnson signed a minor league deal with the Baltimore Orioles.

Chicago White Sox
On August 9, 2017, the Orioles traded Johnson to the Chicago White Sox for cash considerations. He elected free agency on November 6, 2017.

Lancaster Barnstormers
On April 2, 2018, Johnson signed with the Lancaster Barnstormers of the Atlantic League of Professional Baseball. He announced his retirement as an active player via social media on December 22, 2018.

See also

List of second-generation Major League Baseball players

References

External links

1987 births
Living people
Baseball players from Baltimore
Major League Baseball pitchers
Baltimore Orioles players
Seattle Mariners players
Gulf Coast Dodgers players
Ogden Raptors players
Jacksonville Suns players
Great Lakes Loons players
West Oahu Canefires players
Inland Empire 66ers of San Bernardino players
Chattanooga Lookouts players
Bowie Baysox players
Norfolk Tides players
Mesa Solar Sox players
Gulf Coast Orioles players
Aberdeen IronBirds players
Tacoma Rainiers players
Charlotte Knights players
Lancaster Barnstormers players